Coming Apart is a 1969 found footage feature film written and directed by Milton Moses Ginsberg, and starring Rip Torn and Sally Kirkland.

Torn plays a mentally disturbed psychiatrist who secretly films his sexual encounters with women. Ginsberg filmed the entire movie with one static camera setup, in a manner simulating a non-constructed "fake documentary" style, influenced by Jim McBride's David Holzman's Diary. The film was rated X for its sexually explicit scenes.

Plot
New York psychiatrist Joe Glazer, who is going through a divorce, rents an apartment under the assumed name of Glassman and installs a hidden movie camera in a mirrored box to record his life and occasionally talk to. Most of the people who visit his apartment are women, including Joann, a former patient; Monica, an ex-mistress; and Karen, the wife of one of his best friends. Joe has sexual encounters with some of them. The camera records Joe's words and actions as well as his ongoing mental breakdown.

Cast
 Rip Torn as Joe Glazer
 Sally Kirkland as Joann
 Viveca Lindfors as Monica
 Megan McCormick as Joy
 Lois Markle as Elaine
 Lynn Swann as Anita
 Phoebe Dorin as Karen
 Nancy MacKay as Amy
 Julie Garfield as Eugene McCarthy campaign worker
 Kevin O'Connor as Armand

Reception
Vincent Canby of The New York Times wrote, "As an attempt to elevate pornography ... into art, it is often witty and funny but it fails for several reasons, including Ginsberg's self-imposed limitations on form (to which he's not completely faithful)." He elaborated that "the screenplay, like the film, eventually drifts in a horizontal direction into a kind of foggy confusion." Variety stated, "The problem with Coming Apart is that while it suggests some interesting ideas, it can't deliver any of them in cogent form. If Torn is supposed to be some form of saint in the 20th century religion of psychiatry, prepared to accept the truth of his perceptions with detached irony, this only adds to the deadness of the film as public entertainment." Gene Siskel of the Chicago Tribune gave the film 3.5 stars out of 4 and praised Rip Torn for "a brilliantly controlled performance. He never appears to be acting." Kevin Thomas of the Los Angeles Times wrote, "In this dreary study of the disintegration of a New York psychologist (Rip Torn), Ginsberg made the mistake of placing professional actors in improvised Warhol-like situations ... What we're left with, consequently, is scarcely more than some mild but mainly tedious pornography for intellectuals." Gary Arnold of The Washington Post wrote, "Compared to the erotic satire, the film's serious pretensions seem so uninspired and derivative that it's only natural to find that your interest dwindles once the characters start sorting out their souls ... the breakdowns turn morbidly sentimental and theatrically pat." Life reviewer Richard Schickel praised Torn's performance, Ginsberg's inventive use of camera and sound, and the "illuminating" portrayal of a schizophrenic breakdown. Andrew Sarris of The Village Voice gave it a less favorable review, however, and the film was a commercial failure. John Simon described Coming Apart as 'pretentious juvenile pornography'.

The film has since attained a cult following among critics and filmmakers.

See also
 List of American films of 1969

References

External links

1969 films
1969 drama films
American black-and-white films
American drama films
1960s English-language films
1960s American films